The 1986 Australian Drivers' Championship was a CAMS sanctioned Australian motor racing title for Formula Mondial racing cars. It was the 30th Australian Drivers' Championship. The championship winner was awarded the 1986 CAMS Gold Star.

Australian Ralt importer Graham Watson won the title, his only Australian Drivers' Championship, with former Australian Sports Car Champions Peter Hopwood (1983) and Bap Romano (1984) placing second and third respectively, each driving  Ralt RT4s. The only driver to score championship points in any car other than a Ralt RT4 was Peter Macrow, who drove a Cheetah Mk8 to equal thirteenth place in the championship.

Defending and two-time champion John Bowe did not contest the 1986 championship. Instead he drove a Volvo 240T in the Australian Touring Car Championship and also drove the Veskanda-Chevrolet to win the Australian Sports Car Championship. He did however have one last race in the Chris Leach Racing Ralt RT4-Ford when he won the Formula Mondial support race at the Australian Grand Prix meeting in Adelaide in October.

Calendar

The championship was contested over a seven-round series.

Points system
Championship points were awarded on a 9–6–4–3–2–1 basis to the top six placegetters in each round. Each driver could count points only from his or her six best round performances.

Results

Note: There were only five finishers in Round 7 at Amaroo Park.

References

External links
 www.cams.com.au > Titles – CAMS Gold Star

Australian Drivers' Championship
Drivers' Championship